Amelia Smith Calvert (1876, Philadelphia – 1965) was an American botanist noted for studying the flora of Costa Rica.  She was married to entomologist Philip Powell Calvert.

Works

References

1876 births
1965 deaths
19th-century American botanists
Women botanists
20th-century American women scientists
20th-century American botanists
19th-century American women scientists